Gregory James Philip Farrell (born 19 March 1944) is a Scottish former professional footballer.

Beginning his career at Birmingham City, Farrell found his chances limited and George Swindin signed him for a moderate fee to play for Cardiff City in March 1964. Playing as a winger, he often showed flashes of brilliance, including scoring one and supplying four other goals during a 5–3 win over Middlesbrough in May 1966. He eventually left the club in 1967 to sign for Bury. Farrell later went on to play in South Africa before retiring.

References

1944 births
Living people
Footballers from Motherwell
Scottish footballers
Association football wingers
Birmingham City F.C. players
Cardiff City F.C. players
Bury F.C. players
English Football League players